Pakali Ba is a riverside settlement in the Gambia. It is in the Jarra East area of the Lower River Division.

Its co-ordinates are 13° 31' 0" North, 15° 14' 0" West. Pakali Ba is the last village of the Lower River Region along the Sofainyama Bolong. According to the 2013 census it has a population of more than one thousand people.

References

Populated places in the Gambia